Dastana or Dastna may refer to:
 Dastana, Chaharmahal and Bakhtiari
 Dastna, Isfahan